The Seoul Detention Center (Hanja:서울拘置所, alternatively Seoul Prison) is a prison in Uiwang, Gyeonggi Province, South Korea, operated by the Korea Correctional Service.

History
The Detention Center was completed in July 1967.

According to a 1992 report by the Lawyers for Democratic Society, in 1990 the Detention Center had 1,500 prisoners in the medical section with only one full-time doctor, and prisoners frequently lacked necessary medical treatments.

Operations
The Center houses an execution chamber.

Notable prisoners

Current
 Yoo Young-chul: South Korean serial killer

Former
 Former South Korean president Roh Tae-woo
Lee Jae-yong: Vice Chairman of Samsung Group
 Park Geun-hye: Former president of South Korea who was impeached and sentenced to prison for bribery, abuse of power, and other offenses.
 Kang Chang-gu: Serial killer, executed on April 17, 1990.
 Oen Bo-hyun: Spree killer, executed on November 2, 1995.
 Six members of the Chijon family, executed on November 2, 1995.

References

Prisons in South Korea
1967 establishments in South Korea
20th-century architecture in South Korea
Uiwang